Oscar Blandi (Pronounced BLAHN-dee) is a  celebrity hair stylist best known for his work with Kelly Ripa, Sofia Vergara, Faith Hill, and other high-profile clients.

Early life
Oscar Blandi was born and raised in Naples, Italy. He began styling hair at the age of fourteen in the back of his father's salon, and left to work in several of his father's colleagues’ salons. Blandi attended art school. Later he moved to the United States, and worked in the early 1990s at the Astor Place Beauty Salon and a small salon on Thompson Street.  He subsequently opened his own salon in the Plaza Hotel on Madison Avenue. In 2005, Blandi launched his self-developed Oscar Blandi Product Collection.

Salon
The Oscar Blandi Salon opened in 1998.  His team consists of about 30 stylists (including his brother, Luca Blandi), manicurists, and beauticians.

Clientele
Blandi's celebrity clientele include Jessica Alba, Mischa Barton, Monica Bellucci, Jessica Biel, Jennifer Connelly, Kirsten Dunst, Jennifer Garner, Sarah Michelle Gellar, Salma Hayek, Faith Hill, Katie Holmes, Julia Louis-Dreyfus, Katharine McPhee, Sienna Miller, Julianne Moore, Kelly Ripa, Shakira, Molly Sims, Uma Thurman, Sofia Vergara, Reese Witherspoon and Renée Zellweger. Blandi has also toured with Tom Cruise as a hair consultant for the filming of Mission: Impossible III.

Press and appearances

References

External links
 Official website
 Oscar Blandi Indonesia

American hairdressers
Living people
Year of birth missing (living people)